The 2017–18 BTravel WABA League was the 17th season of the Adriatic League. Competition included twelve teams from seven countries. In this season participating clubs from Serbia, Croatia, Montenegro, Bosnia and Herzegovina, Bulgaria, Turkey and Slovenia.

Team information

Regular season
In the Regular season was played with 12 teams divided into 2 groups of 6 teams and play a dual circuit system, each with one game each at home and away. The four best teams in each group at the end of the regular season were placed in the League 8. The regular season began on 4 October 2017 and it will end on 21 December 2017.

Group A

Group B

League 8

In the League 8 was played with 8 teams and play a dual circuit system, each with one game each at home and away. The four best teams in League 8 at the end of the last round were placed on the Final Four. The regular season began on 10 January 2018 and it will end on 15 March 2018.

Classification 9–12

Classification 9–12 of the Adriatic League took place between 28 February 2018 and it will end on 14 March 2018.

Ninth place game

Eleventh place game

Final Four

Final Four to be played from 24–25 March 2018 in the Montana, Bulgaria.

Final standings

Awards
Player of the Year: Sarah Boothe (195-F/C-90) of  Montana 2003
Guard of the Year: Božica Mujović (178-G-96) of  Budućnost Bemax
Forward of the Year: Iva Slonjšak (183-SG-97) of  Cinkarna Celje
Center of the Year: Sarah Boothe (195-F/C-90) of  Montana 2003
Defensive Player of the Year: Larisa Ocvirk (187-SF-97) of  Cinkarna Celje
Most Improved Player of the Year: Zala Friškovec (178-G-99) of  Cinkarna Celje
Newcomer of the Year: Lucija Kostić (187-F-00) of  Trešnjevka 2009
Coach of the Year: Goran Bošković of  Budućnost Bemax

1st Team
PG: Božica Mujović (178-G-96) of  Budućnost Bemax
SG: Zala Friškovec (178-G-99) of  Cinkarna Celje
SF: Iva Slonjšak (183-SG-97) of  Cinkarna Celje
PF: Kristina Topuzović (183-F/G-94) of  Budućnost Bemax
C: Sarah Boothe (195-F/C-90) of  Montana 2003

2nd Team
PG: Miljana Bojović (181-G-87) of  CCC Polkowice
SG: Karla Erjavec (172-G-99) of  Trešnjevka 2009
SF: Larisa Ocvirk (187-SF-97) of  Cinkarna Celje
PF: Tearra Banks (188-C-95) of  Beroe
C: Ivanka Matić (193-C/F-79) of  Partizan 1953

All-Defensive Team
PG: Božica Mujović (178-G-96) of  Budućnost Bemax
SG: Iva Todorić (174-F-93) of  Medveščak
SF: Larisa Ocvirk (187-SF-97) of  Cinkarna Celje
PF/C: Oderah Chidom (193-F-95) of  Cinkarna Celje
C: Patricia Bura (188-C-96) of  Medveščak

Honorable Mention
Nikolina Babić (177-G-95) of  Budućnost Bemax
Nikolina Džebo (186-C-95) of  Budućnost Bemax
Mina Đorđević (186-PF-99) of  Crvena zvezda
Biljana Stjepanović (190-C-87) of  Crvena zvezda
Jovana Marković (186-PF-97) of  Play Off Ultra

All-Newcomers Team
PG: Nika Mühl (177-PG-01) of  Trešnjevka 2009
SG: Teodora Dineva (178-G/F-96) of  Beroe
SF: Dragana Nikolić (189-PF-95) of  Kraljevo
PF: Lucija Kostić (187-F-00) of  Trešnjevka 2009
PF/C: Ana Vojtulek (187-C-99) of  Medveščak

See also 
 2017–18 ABA League First Division
 2017–18 ABA League Second Division
2017–18 domestic competitions
  2017–18 First Women's Basketball League of Serbia

References

External links
 Official website

 
2017-18
2017–18 in European women's basketball leagues
2017–18 in Serbian basketball
2017–18 in Bosnia and Herzegovina basketball
2017–18 in Montenegrin basketball
2017–18 in Slovenian basketball
2017–18 in Croatian basketball
2017–18 in Bulgarian basketball
2017–18 in Turkish basketball